The 2019 Division 1, part of the 2019 Swedish football season is the 14th season of Sweden's third-tier football league in its current format. The 2019 fixtures were released in December 2018. The season started on 6 April 2019 and ended on 2 November 2019.

Teams
32 teams contest the league divided into two divisions, Norra and Södra. 22 returning from the 2018 season, three relegated from Superettan and seven promoted from Division 2. The champion of each division will qualify directly for promotion to Superettan, while the two runners-up compete in a play-off against the thirteenth and fourteenth teams from Superettan to decide who will play in the 2020 Superettan. The bottom three teams in each division will qualify directly for relegation to Division 2, while the two thirteenth-placed teams compete in a play-off with the top two runners-up from Division 2 to decide who will play in 2020 Division 1.

Stadia and locations

Norra

Södra

 1 Correct as of end of 2018 season

League tables

Norra

Norra Results

Södra

Södra Results

Playoffs
The 13th-placed teams of each division meets the best two runners-up from 2019 Division 2 in two-legged ties on a home-and-away basis with the team from Division 1 finishing at home.

Sollentuna FK won 4–1 on aggregate.

Oskarshamns AIK won 4–0 on aggregate.

Season statistics

Top scorers - Norra

Top scorers - Södra

References

2019 in Swedish association football leagues
2019–20 in European third tier association football leagues